Ken or Kenneth Wood may refer to:
Ken Wood (baseball) (1924–2007), baseball player
Ken Wood (manufacturer) (1916–1997), founder of Kenwood Manufacturing Co.
Ken Wood (coach) (1929–2018), Australian swimming coach
Ken Wood (athlete) (1933–2008), British middle-distance runner
Ken Wood (rugby league) (1906–1942), Australian rugby league
Kenneth H. Wood (1917–2008), Seventh-day Adventist minister and author
Kenneth Berridge Wood (1885–1968), English rugby union player

See also
Kenneth Woods (born 1968), American conductor
Kenwood (disambiguation)